A heavy isotope diet is one in that contains nutrients in which some atoms are replaced with their heavier non-radioactive isotopes, such as deuterium 2H or heavy carbon 13C. Biomolecules that incorporate heavier isotopes give rise to more stable molecular structures, which is hypothesized to increase resistance to damage associated with ageing or diseases.

Medicines with some hydrogen atoms substituted with deuterium are called deuterated drugs, while substances that are essential nutrients can be used as food constituents, making this food "isotopic". Consumed with food, these nutrients become building material for the body. The examples are deuterated polyunsaturated fatty acids, essential aminoacids, DNA bases such as cytosine, or heavy water and glucose.

Suggested mechanism
One of the most pernicious and irreparable types of oxidative damage inflicted by reactive oxygen species (ROS) upon biomolecules involves the carbon-hydrogen bond cleavage (hydrogen abstraction). Intriguingly, the biomolecules most damageable by this type of damage belong to the group of essential nutrients (10 out of 20 amino acids; nucleosides at certain conditions (conditionally essential); all polyunsaturated fatty acids). In theory, replacing hydrogen with deuterium "reinforces" the bond due to the kinetic isotope effect, and such reinforced biomolecules taken up by the body will be more resistant to ROS.

Deuterated omega-6 fatty acids for humans with degenerative diseases
The company Retrotope pioneered the development a source of deuterated omega-6 fatty acid di-deuterated linoleic acid ethyl ester (RT001) as a food additive for potential treatment of neurodegenerative diseases such as Friedreich’s ataxia and infantile neuroaxonal dystrophy. FDA has granted it an orphan drug designation and it passed the Phase I/II clinical trials (as of 2018).

See also 
 Deuterated drug
Heavy water
 RT001

References

External links
 a New Scientist article about ifood
 a Scientific American article about content of 13C in American fast food

Life extension
Nutrients
Hypotheses